Shabaib Al-Khaldi (born on 11 August 1998) is a Kuwaiti professional footballer who plays for Kazma and the Kuwaiti national team.

International career
He debuted internationally on 14 November 2019, at the 2022 FIFA World Cup qualification, and scored his first goal in a major competition for Kuwait against Chinese Taipei in a 9–0 victory.

International goals
Scores and results list Kuwait's goal tally first.

Honours
Kazma:
Kuwait Emir Cup (1): 2022

Individual
Kuwait Premier League top scorer: 2021–22

References

External links
 
 

1998 births
Living people
Kuwaiti footballers
Kuwait international footballers
Association football midfielders
Kazma SC players
Al-Sahel SC (Kuwait) players
Kuwait Premier League players